Harold Gurnee (born January 25, 1925, in New York, New York, U.S.) is an American television director who directed all of the television shows hosted by David Letterman on NBC.  Gurnee directed the NBC daytime program The David Letterman Show, then moved with Letterman to Late Night with David Letterman in 1982.  Gurnee himself would often be heard or appear on the show, when Letterman would call on him in the control room to facilitate a comedy segment.  When introducing him, Letterman would deliberately stumble over and mispronounce his last name (e.g., "Hal Gurtner...Gurnter"), or confuse him with Dan Gurney (e.g. "Hal... our Emmy award winning director and legendary race car driver").

When Letterman moved to CBS in 1993, Gurnee followed Letterman to direct the Late Show with David Letterman, and remained its director and supervising producer from 1993 to 1995.

Gurnee also directed The Tonight Show during the Jack Paar era, along with Paar's later primetime show, The Jack Paar Program, and directed episodes of The Man Show.

References

External links

American television directors
1935 births
Living people
Television personalities from New York City